A. Thomas Tymoczko (September 1, 1943August 8, 1996) was a philosopher specializing in logic and the philosophy of mathematics. He taught at Smith College in Northampton, Massachusetts from 1971 until his death from stomach cancer in 1996, aged 52.

His publications include New Directions in the Philosophy of Mathematics, an edited collection of essays for which he wrote individual introductions, and Sweet Reason: A Field Guide to Modern Logic, co-authored by Jim Henle.  In addition, he published a number of philosophical articles, such as "The Four-Color Problem and its Philosophical Significance", which argues that the increasing use of computers is changing the nature of mathematical proof.

He is considered to be a member of the fallibilist school in philosophy of mathematics.  Philip Kitcher dubbed this school the "maverick" tradition in the philosophy of mathematics. (Paul Ernest)

He completed an undergraduate degree from Harvard University in 1965, and his PhD from the same university in 1972.

Personal life
Tymoczko was married to comparative literature scholar Maria Tymoczko of the University of Massachusetts Amherst. Their three children include music composer Dmitri Tymoczko and Smith College mathematics professor Julianna Tymoczko.

References

1943 births
1996 deaths
People from New Kensington, Pennsylvania
Harvard Graduate School of Arts and Sciences alumni
Smith College faculty
20th-century American philosophers

Deaths from cancer in the United States
Deaths from stomach cancer